Brikama Ba is a small town in the Fulladu East District, Central River Division, The Gambia. As of 2022, it has an estimated population of 10,343.

The Kaolang Forest Park is located nearby.

References

Populated places in the Gambia